The 1964 Tampa Spartans football team represented the University of Tampa in the 1964 NCAA College Division football season. It was the Spartans' 28th season. The team was led by head coach Sam Bailey, in his first year, and played their home games at Phillips Field in Tampa, Florida. They finished with a record of four wins and six losses (4–6).

Schedule

References

Tampa
Tampa Spartans football seasons
Tampa Spartans football